Paweł Przedpełski (born 23 June 1995) is a speedway rider from Poland.

Speedway career
He rode in the top tier of British Speedway riding for the Leicester Lions in the SGB Premiership 2017. He currently rides for Apator Toruń in Poland. He is three times winner of the Team Speedway Junior World Championship in 2014, 2015 and 2016.

In August 2021, during the Speedway Grand Prix Qualification he won the GP Challenge for the second time in his career, which ensured that he claimed a permanent slot for the 2022 Speedway Grand Prix.

Przedpełski finished in 15th place during the 2022 Speedway World Championship, after securing 29 points during the 2022 Speedway Grand Prix. The 15th place finish resulted in him losing his place for the 2023 Speedway Grand Prix.

Major results

World individual Championship
2014 Speedway Grand Prix 27th
2016 Speedway Grand Prix 17th
2017 Speedway Grand Prix 19th
2021 Speedway Grand Prix 17th
2022 Speedway Grand Prix - 15th

References 

1995 births
Living people
Polish speedway riders
Leicester Lions riders